Owando is a town in the central Republic of the Congo, lying on the Kouyou River. It is the capital of Cuvette Department and an autonomous commune. It is home to a market and has an airport.

It was formerly known as Fort-Rousset.  It gained the status of "commune" on March 16, 2017

History 
Founded as Rousset in 1903 and quickly renamed Fort-Rousset in 1904, it was renamed as Owando in 1977.

A Roman Catholic diocese was established on 14 September 1955.

References

External links
 Owando blog, a compilation of information in French

Populated places in the Republic of the Congo
Cuvette Department
Populated places established in 1903
1903 establishments in French Equatorial Africa